The 2002 Trans-Am Series was the 37th season of the Sports Car Club of America's Trans-Am Series.

Results

References

Trans-Am Series
Trans-Am